Permocupedoidea is a superfamily of Protocoleoptera that contains two known families. The type family is Permocupedidae.

References

 
Beetle superfamilies